Malvern Preparatory School, commonly referred to as Malvern Prep, is an independent Catholic middle school and college preparatory high school for boys located in Malvern, Pennsylvania within the Archdiocese of Philadelphia. The school was started and is still run by Order of Saint Augustine and is a member of the Augustinian Secondary Education Association. Malvern Prep is a member of the Inter-Academic League which also includes Episcopal Academy, Germantown Academy, Penn Charter, The Haverford School, and Springside Chestnut Hill Academy.

History
Malvern Prep was founded as a preparatory academy on the campus of Villanova University in 1842 at the Belle-Aire farm, which the Augustinian order purchased in January 1842.  The academy was named "St. Nicholas of Tolentine Academy" in 1901.

In 1922, due to the expansion of Villanova's college program and increasing distinctions being made between the attendees of the academy and the college, it was decided to remove the academy from Villanova's campus. The Rosengarten family of Malvern sold a  part of its old farm between Warren Avenue and Paoli Pike to the Augustinians, and the academy became Malvern Preparatory School. The property included the site of the Paoli Massacre, a Revolutionary War battlefield that Malvern Prep owned until 2000, when the federal government purchased it. Only two original buildings were suitable for classes and are still preserved; these are the original farmhouse (Austin Hall) and another farm building (the Friary, or Alber's Hall). Because the school needed more space, it built three new buildings in 1924. The first graduating class of Malvern Prep, almost all of whom were boarders, graduated in 1927.

Malvern Prep reached 200 students in 1953 and went through another construction phase, erecting six new buildings in the next eight years. Over the next twenty years, the number of boarders decreased, eventually to zero; the school is now entirely a day school. The school erected a new indoor sports center (O'Neill Sports Center), a dining hall (Stewart Hall, a then-existing building, Villanova Hall), and several athletic fields in the late 1990s and early 2000s. Malvern Prep has undergone several new constructions in recent years, with a new art center named in honor of the former president, Reverend David J. Duffy, O.S.A. '48, and a new outdoor athletic complex bearing the name of legendary former football coach Gamp Pellegrini.

Augustinians in North America

The North American Augustinian order was founded in 1796 when Irish friars arrived in Philadelphia. Michael Hurley was the first American to join the order the following year. Friars established schools, a university, and other works throughout the Americas, also including Villanova University in Philadelphia and Merrimack College. While this school was founded in 1842, by 1909, two Augustinian houses and a school had been established in Chicago, 1922 in San Diego, by 1925 a school in Ojai and Los Angeles; 1926 a school in Oklahoma; in 1947 Merrimack College; in 1953 a school in Pennsylvania; 1954 a school in Detroit, Michigan; 1959 a school in New Jersey and in 1962 a school in Illinois.

Curriculum

Malvern offers Advanced Placement courses in Computer Science, Literature and Composition, French, Spanish, Latin, Calculus (AB and BC), Statistics, Biology, Chemistry, Physics (Mechanics and Electro/Magnetism), Environmental Science, Economics (Micro and Macro), U.S. Government, and U.S. History. Malvern also offers a wide variety of elective/humanities courses such as Music Theory, Entrepreneurship, Elements of Philosophy, Medical Ethics, Music Recording and Technology, and Graphic Design.

Graduates from Malvern typically attend schools such as Villanova University, the University of Notre Dame, Boston College, the University of Pennsylvania, Cornell University, Georgetown University, Penn State – University Park, Drexel University, and Johns Hopkins University.

Extracurricular activities

Athletics 

Malvern, a member of the Inter-Ac League, participates in sixteen varsity sports: baseball, basketball, crew, cross country, football, golf, ice hockey, indoor track, lacrosse, soccer, squash, swimming & diving, tennis, water polo, wrestling, rugby and sailing. Malvern competes for the Heyward Cup with five other schools: Germantown Academy, Haverford School, Springside Chestnut Hill Academy, William Penn Charter, and Episcopal Academy. Malvern last won the Heyward Cup in the 2017–18 academic year.

Football and basketball 
Malvern Prep's football and basketball programs are two of the most successful in southeast Pennsylvania, finishing consistently in the "Inquirer's Top Ten" and also being highly successful the Inter-Academic League each year. The football team is currently coached by Dave Gueriera, while Paul Romanczuk heads the basketball team.

Ice hockey
Malvern's Ice Hockey team holds the most titles in the Varsity AAA Flyers Cup, the highest level of High School Hockey in PA. Malvern won the Varsity AAA Flyers Cup five years in a row from 2001 to 2005 (8 total) and in 1987, 1990, and 1997. Malvern has also won the Pennsylvania Varsity AAA State Championship twice (1990 & 2004). Head coach Dave Dorman leads the current team. Many former players have gone on to play Division 1 (NCAA), Division 1 Club (ACHA), and even professionally in the NHL and across Europe.

Rugby
Malvern started a rugby team in the spring of 2010, playing in the Brandywine district of EPRU. Malvern learned to play the game under head coach Dennis Melesky and Assistant Wayne DiMarco. Soon the team was hitting the pitch and playing experienced teams. The team ended up finishing 6–1 on the season.

Lacrosse, baseball and cross country
In 2006, Malvern Prep's Lacrosse team, coached by John McEvoy, went on to win the Pennsylvania State Lacrosse Championship and boasts three All-Americans. Also, Malvern Prep's baseball team finished off the season by winning the Pennsylvania Independent School's tournament. The baseball team could not win the state championship because the Inter-Ac league is not part of the PIAA. The six senior baseball players are all moving on to play at the next level in college. The Cross Country team has won the Inter-Ac Championships the past five years, including a perfect 15 points in 2005 (placed 1st through 5th). The Cross Country team has run at the Nike Northeastern Regionals. In 2014, the Lacrosse team was undefeated, capturing the coveted "24-0" season.
In 2015, the Malvern Prep Varsity Baseball team won the Inter-ac for the fifth straight year, thus completing the "Five Peat".

Rowing
In 2004, the varsity quad won its first SRA National title in addition to a USRowing National Youth Invitational Championship, Philadelphia City Championship, and a second-place finish at the Stotesbury Cup. In the summer of 2004, the team elected to train together. Two of its varsity quad members, Pat Ryan and Justin Teti, represented the United States at the Junior World Championships in Banyoles, Spain, in the double event.

In 2005 the varsity squad won the Stotesbury Cup and repeated its victories at SRA Nationals and the USRowing Youth Invitational. Again the following summer, the team continued to train together and competed at the prestigious Henley Royal Regatta in England, where they advanced to the quarterfinals.

In 2007 the Malvern Varsity Quad won the triple crown, coming in first place at the Philadelphia City Championship and again repeating victories at SRA Nationals and the Stotesbury Cup Regatta. They also traveled overseas to compete at the Henley Royal Regatta. The varsity quad made it to the quarterfinals of the Fawley Challenge Cup Event.

In 2008 the Varsity Quad went undefeated, won at Philadelphia City Championship, SRA Nationals, Stotesbury Cup, USRowing Youth Nationals, and have made it to the semifinals of the Fawley Challenge Cup before losing. They also were selected to represent the United States at the Can Am Mex cup.

In 2013 the Varsity Heavyweight Quad of Christian Frey, Alex Stozcko, Jim Sincavage, and Christopher White won an SRA National Championship.

In 2014 The Varsity Heavyweight Quad followed up with another SRA National Championship with a crew of Jim Sincavage, Christian Frey, C White, and Jackson Connor.

Head coach Craig Hoffman led the rowing program for over a decade. Throughout his tenure as head coach, Hoffman has guided Malvern to among the elite rowing schools in the country. Hoffman has won numerous national championships, city championships, and Stotesbury Cups. Hoffman also has helped coach to United States National Rowing Team.

Many former Malvern rowers have continued to go on and represent the United States in rowing. Malvern consistently sends rowers to top rowing schools like University of Washington, Yale University, Dartmouth College, Princeton University, University of California Berkeley, University of Pennsylvania, Cornell University, and Columbia University.

Golf
Malvern Prep has a JV and Varsity team that competes in the fall season with other Inter-Ac and public schools. Malvern has won the inter-ac title many times. Malvern practices at Applebrook CC and uses Waynesborough CC for its home matches. Malvern has sent many golfers to Division 1 programs, including Princeton, Penn, Lehigh, UVA, and Villanova. Malvern also holds several course records in the area for high school matches.

Water polo
Malvern Prep has both an Upper School and a Middle School water polo team. Malvern participates in the Inter-Academic League and is consistently one of the top teams in the league. The program was started by Coach Jay Schiller, who currently coaches the Upper School Team. The Middle School team consists of boys from grades 6–8 and competes with Inter-Academic League teams.

Notable alumni
David Boreanaz (Class of 1987), actor
Tim Cooney (Class of 2009), Major League Baseball player
Jim Croce (post-graduate), American folk and rock singer-songwriter
Ben Davis (Class of 1995), Major League Baseball player
David DiLucia (Class of 1988), tennis player
Fran Dunphy (Class of 1967), basketball coach
Larry Farnese (Class of 1986), Pennsylvania state senator
Phil Gosselin (Class of 2007), Major League Baseball player
Michael Gostigian (Class of 1981), pentathlete, three-time Olympian for United States
Alex Hornibrook (Class of 2015), former college football quarterback
Bill Kuharich (Class of 1972), National Football League executive
Wayne Millner (Class of 1933), National Football League player, member of Pro Football Hall of Fame
Carl Nassib (Class of 2011), National Football League player
Ryan Nassib (Class of 2008), National Football League player
Paul Pelosi (attended), Nancy Pelosi's husband
Zack Steffen (attended), professional soccer player

Notable staff 
 Michael S. Steele
Fran Dunphy

References

External links
Malvern Preparatory School

Educational institutions established in 1842
Catholic secondary schools in Pennsylvania
Augustinian schools
Boys' schools in the United States
Schools in Chester County, Pennsylvania
Private middle schools in Pennsylvania
1842 establishments in Pennsylvania